Ramanan may mean:
Ramanan (play in verse), a legendary Malayalam poem by Changampuzha Krishna Pillai, which was the most celebrated poem in Kerala for a generation
Ramanan (film), a 1967 film adaptation of the poem
S. Ramanan, a mathematician from India specializing in algebraic geometry
A. V. Ramanan, a Tamil T. V. host